Mê Linh is a rural district (huyện) of Hanoi, formerly of Vĩnh Phúc province, in the Red River Delta region of northern Vietnam.

Mê Linh district is bordered by Đông Anh district to the east, Sóc Sơn district to the northeast, Đan Phượng district to the south, Vĩnh Phúc province to the west and north.

The district is subdivided to 18 commune-level subdivisions, including the townships of Quang Minh, Chi Đông and the rural communes of Đại Thịnh (district capital), Chu Phan, Hoàng Kim, Kim Hoa, Liên Mạc, Mê Linh, Tam Đồng, Thạch Đà, Thanh Lâm, Tiền Phong, Tiến Thắng, Tiến Thịnh, Tráng Việt, Tự Lập, Văn Khê, Vạn Yên.

Districts of Hanoi